The men's 800 metres event at the 2016 Summer Olympics took place between 12–15 August at the Olympic Stadium. Fifty-eight athletes from 39 nations competed. The event was won by David Rudisha of Kenya, the fourth man to successfully defend Olympic gold in the 800 metres. Taoufik Makhloufi of Algeria took silver, the first medal for the nation in the 800 metres since 2000. The United States had an even longer medal-less streak broken, as Clayton Murphy's bronze was their first since 1992.

Summary

In the first round, Amos was a surprise elimination, faring poorly at the end of a slow, tactical race.  The semi-finals saw the elimination of world #1 Amel Tuka who has not shown evidence of his finishing kick this year, and world championship silver medalist Adam Kszczot. Frenchman Pierre-Ambroise Bosse and Algerian Makhloufi shared the semi-final's leading time of 1:43.85 in the first semi-final, with Rudisha just three hundredths slower. Kipketer won the third semi-final.

In the final, Kenyan trials winner Kipketer took the lead, closing off Rudisha's challenge after the break.  Kipketer took the 200 in 23.2 and continued to lead at 400 in 49.3 but Rudisha was just a step behind.  Through the turn, Rudisha went around Kipketer and accelerated down the backstretch.  The next chaser was Bosse, in position to challenge at the 600 metres in 1:16.1, but most of the field was really in contention, within about a second.  Through the final turn, Rudisha established separation, with Bosse the last to fall off.  Taoufik Makhloufi tracked Bosse through the turn and sped by as they hit the straightaway.  Makhloufi took off in chase of Rudisha but was too far back to make any headway.  Clayton Murphy came from sixth place to sprint past Bosse to take the bronze.

While it was "only" Rudisha's eleventh best performance, only four other men have ever run faster.  It was also Rudisha's best race since 2012.  Makhloufi set the national record for Algeria and became the seventeenth fastest man in history.  Murphy became #31 and the #3 American in history.  Rudisha joined Douglas Lowe, Mal Whitfield and Peter Snell in defending the Olympic 800 metres championship, the first to accomplish the feat in over 50 years.

Background

This was the 28th appearance of the event, which is one of 12 athletics events to have been held at every Summer Olympics. The top two men from 2012, gold medalist David Rudisha of Kenya and silver medalist Nijel Amos of Botswana, returned along with sixth-place finisher Mohammed Aman of Ethiopia. Rudisha entered the competition as the reigning 2012 Olympic champion and the 2015 World Champion. He also held the season's fastest time at 1:43.35 minutes. His principal challengers included Kenyans Alfred Kipketer and Ferguson Rotich, the African champion Amos, and Olympic 1500 metres champion Taoufik Makhloufi.

Djibouti, Kosovo, Slovenia, and the Refugee Olympic Team appeared in the event for the first time. Great Britain made its 27th appearance, most among all nations, having had no competitors in the event only in the 1904 Games in St. Louis.

Qualification

A National Olympic Committee (NOC) could enter up to 3 qualified athletes in the men's 800 metres event if all athletes meet the entry standard during the qualifying period. (The limit of 3 has been in place since the 1930 Olympic Congress.) The qualifying standard was 1:46.00. The qualifying period was from 1 May 2015 to 11 July 2016. The qualifying time standards could be obtained in various meets during the given period that have the approval of the IAAF. Indoor and outdoor meets were accepted. NOCs could also use their universality place—each NOC could enter one male athlete regardless of time if they had no male athletes meeting the entry standard for an athletics event—in the 800 metres.

Competition format

The men's 800 metres used a three-round format, the most common format since 1912 though there had been variations. The "fastest loser" system introduced in 1964 was used for the first two rounds. There were seven first-round heats, each with 8 or 9 athletes; the top three runners in each heat as well as the next three fastest overall advanced to the semifinals. There were three semifinals with 8 athletes each; the top two runners in each semifinal and the next two fastest overall advanced to the eight-man final.

Records

Prior to this competition, the existing world and Olympic records were as follows.

The following national record was established during the competition:

Schedule
All times are Brasília Time (UTC−3).

Results

Round 1
Qualification rule: First 3 in each heat (Q) and the next 3 fastest (q) advance to the Semifinals.

Heat 1

Heat 2

Heat 3

Heat 4

Heat 5

Heat 6

Heat 7

Semifinals
Qualification rule: First 2 in each heat (Q) and the next 2 fastest (q) advance to the Final.

Semifinal 1

Semifinal 2

Semifinal 3

Final

References

Men's 800 metres
2016
Men's events at the 2016 Summer Olympics